Mong Yawng Yazawin is a 19th-century Burmese chronicle that covers the history of the Shan state of Mong Yawng. It is believed to have been written after the publication of Hmannan Yazawin.

References

Bibliography
 

Burmese chronicles